Thelohanellus is a genus of myxozoan in the family Myxobolidae..

Species
 Thelohanellus arii Kpatcha, Diebakate, Faye & Toguebaye, 1995 
 Thelohanellus pyriformis (Thelohan, 1892)
 Thelohanellus kitauei Egusa & Nakajima, 1981

References

Cnidarian genera
Myxobolidae